"He's Comin'" is a song recorded by the German artist Nana. It was released in September 1997 as the fourth single from his debut album, Nana. The song reached number four in Germany, as well as peaking at number 11 in Switzerland and number 14 in Austria.

Track listings
 CD single (Europe, 1997)
 "He's Comin'" (Radio Mix) - 3:57
 "Let It Rain" (Radio Mix)	- 3:44
 "He's Comin'" (Video Edit) - 3:57
 "He's Comin'" (Extended Mix) - 6:19

Music video
The music video was directed by Patric Ullaeus.

Charts and sales

Weekly charts

Year-end charts

Certifications

References

1997 singles
Songs written by Toni Cottura
1997 songs
Songs written by Bülent Aris